Mycena cyanorrhiza is a small white mushroom which has blue colors.  Unlike hallucinogenic mushrooms, the blue color is not related to psilocin polymerization. It grows in forests on wood and has a white spore print.

Gallery

References

External links
 Mycena cyanorrhiza description and photo

cyanorrhiza
Fungi of Europe
Fungi of North America
Taxa named by Lucien Quélet